Nationality words link to articles with information on the nation's poetry or literature (for instance, Irish or France).

Events
 April 20 - Lord Byron and Thomas Moore visit Leigh Hunt in the Surrey Gaol.
 April 23 - Byron takes Hunt some books to help with his composition of Francesca da Rimini.
 June 17–18 - German poet Theodor Körner, fighting with the Königlich Preußisches Freikorps von Lützow in the German campaign against Napoleon (War of the Sixth Coalition), composes the sonnet Abschied vom Leben ("Farewell to Life") while lying severely wounded.
 August 25 - Theodor Körner composes the patriotic lyric Schwertlied ("Sword Song") the night before his death in action aged 21.
 Autumn - Robert Southey becomes Poet Laureate of the United Kingdom after Walter Scott's refusal of the post.
 First award of the Chancellor's Gold Medal for poetry at the University of Cambridge in England, to George Waddington for "Columbus".
 Kālidāsa's 4th/5th century Sanskrit poem Meghadūta is first translated into English by Horace Hayman Wilson.

Works published

United Kingdom

 William Lisle Bowles, The Missionary, published anonymously
 Lord Byron:
 The Bride of Abydos: A Turkish tale published in early December and within the month sells 6,000 copies, making Byron sought-after in the London literary scene as he receives invitations daily
 The Giaour: A fragment of a Turkish tale
 The Waltz: An Apostrophic Hymn, published under the pen name "Horace Hornem Esq."
 Allan Cunningham, Songs
 Thomas John Dibdin, A Metrical History of England
 James Hogg, The Queen's Wake
 Mary Russell Mitford, Narrative Poems on the Female Character
 James Montgomery, The World Before the Flood
 Thomas Moore, writing as "Thomas Brown, the younger", Intercepted Letters; or, The Twopenny Post-Bag, several editions this year
 Sir Walter Scott:
 Rokeby, five editions this year; inspired Jokeby, an anonymous parody by John Roby, also published this year
 The Bridal of Triermain; or, The Vale of St. John
 Percy Bysshe Shelley, Queen Mab
 Horatio Smith and James Smith, Horace in London, mostly by James Smith

United States
 Washington Allston, The Sylphs of the Seasons, with Other Poems, "First American from the London edition" Boston; Cambridge: Published by Cummings and Hilliard; Hilliard & Metcalf, American living in and published in the United Kingdom; sentimental and satirical poems; written while the author was a student at Harvard and published during his convalescence; the book was praised by William Wordsworth and Robert Southey
 Edwin Clifford Holland, Odes, Naval Songs, and Other Occasional Poems
 William Kilty, attributed, The Vision of Don Croker
 James Kirke Paulding, The Lay of the Scottish Fiddle: A Tale of Havre de Grace, Supposed to Be Written by Walter Scott, Esq., a long poem and verse parody of the romantic poetry of Sir Walter Scott, particularly Scott's Lay of the Last Minstrel; Paulding's work condemns the British invasion of Chesapeake Bay in the War of 1812 and is strongly criticized in the London Quarterly
 George Watterston, The Scenes of Youth

Other
 Cristóbal de Beña, Spanish poet published in the United Kingdom:
 Fábulas políticas ("Political Fables")
 La lira de la libertad ("Liberty's Lyre"), London: M'Dowall

Births
Death years link to the corresponding "[year] in poetry" article:
 January 23 – Charles Harpur (died 1868), Australian
 February 26 – Adrien Rouquette (died 1887), American poet and missionary
 March 8 – Christopher Pearse Cranch (died 1892), American writer and artist
 March 18 – Christian Friedrich Hebbel (died 1863), German poet and dramatist
 June 20 – Charles Timothy Brooks (died 1883), American translator, poet, Transcendentalist and Unitarian pastor
 June 21 – William Edmondstoune Aytoun (died 1865), Scottish
 August 28 – Jones Very (died 1880), American poet, essayist, Transcendentalist and clergyman
 September 27 – Epes Sargent (died 1880), American editor, poet and playwright
 October 17 – Georg Büchner (died 1837), German dramatist, poet and writer
 November 13 (November 1 O.S.) – Petar II Petrović-Njegoš (died 1851), Serbian poet and Prince-Bishop of Montenegro

Deaths
Birth years link to the corresponding "[year] in poetry" article:
 January 20 - Christoph Martin Wieland (born 1733), German poet, translator and editor
 June 26 - Jean-François Cailhava de L'Estandoux (born 1731), French dramatist, poet and critic
 August 11 - Henry James Pye (born 1745), English Poet Laureate
 Autumn - Henrietta Battier (born c. 1751), Irish poet, satirist and actress

See also
 Poetry
 List of years in poetry
 List of years in literature
 19th century in literature
 19th century in poetry

 Romantic poetry
 Golden Age of Russian Poetry (1800–1850)
 Weimar Classicism period in Germany, commonly considered to have begun in 1788  and to have ended either in 1805, with the death of Friedrich Schiller, or 1832, with the death of Goethe
 List of poets

Notes

19th-century poetry
Poetry